Ofer Lifschitz, (born in kibbutz Masada, Israel in 1958) is an Israeli politician and head of Brit Olam.

Lifschitz left Israel to travel in 1984, before settling in the United States in 1988. There, he set up an electrical contracting firm, and co-founded Global Peace Solution, a charity focusing on international conflict resolution.

In 2004 Lifschitz returned to Israel and founded Brit Olam.

External links
Official Global Peace Solution website

Leaders of political parties in Israel
1958 births
Living people
Brit Olam politicians